Daniel Lee Mazur is a mountain climber, trekker, and expedition leader who has ascended nine of the world's highest summits, including Mount Everest and K2. In addition, he is known for several high altitude mountain rescues: the 1991 rescue of Roman Giutashvili from Mount Everest, the rescue of Gary Ball from K2 in 1992, the rescue in 2006 of Australian climber Lincoln Hall from Mount Everest, and the rescue of British mountaineer Rick Allen from Broad Peak. In 2018, Daniel Mazur was awarded the Sir Edmund Hillary Mountain Legacy Medal "for remarkable service in the conservation of culture and nature in mountainous regions."

Rescue cases

Roman Giutashvili rescue 
Having reached the summit of Mount Everest on an expedition together with Anatoli Boukreev in 1991, Mazur was involved in an early rescue of Georgian climber Roman Giutashvili from just below the summit of Everest.

Gary Ball rescue 
In 1992 on K2, Mazur and his team worked together to rescue Gary Ball from 8300 metres. Gary was struck down by a pulmonary embolism. The rescue took several days, descending technical ground, and rescuers included Rob Hall, Scott Fischer, Ed Viesturs, Neal Beidleman and Jon Pratt

Lincoln Hall rescue 
At 7:30 am on May 26, 2006, Mazur and his fellow ascending climbers Andrew Brash (Canada), Myles Osborne (UK) and Jangbu Sherpa (Nepal) were 
eight hours into their planned ascent to the summit up the North Ridge of Mount Everest, located along a severe ridge line, dropping off 10,000 feet to one side and 7,000 feet to the other. Two hours below the summit, conditions seemed perfect. There was no wind and no clouds and they were feeling strong and healthy.

When rounding a corner on the trail to the summit the team encountered Lincoln Hall, an Australian climber at an altitude of approximately 28,000 feet. Hall had been 'left for dead' by his own expedition team on the descent from the summit the previous day at around 8600 meters on Everest after collapsing, failing to respond to prolonged treatment and being unable to walk. He was now sitting alone on the trail with his jacket around his waist, no hat and no gloves, and without any of the proper equipment for survival in such conditions. The group found he was suffering from symptoms of cerebral oedema, frostbite and dehydration as he was hallucinating, mumbling deliriously and appeared generally incoherent in his responses to offers of help.

The rescuers replaced the hat, jacket and gloves Mr. Hall had discarded, anchored him to the mountain, and gave him their own oxygen, food and water. They radioed Hall's team, who had given him up for dead, and convinced them he was still alive and must be saved. Mr. Hall's team leader had already called his wife the night before to tell her that Hall was dead. The rescuers arranged for Sherpas from Mr. Hall's team to ascend and help with the rescue. For four hours, Mazur's team stayed to care for Mr. Hall. Phil Crampton coordinated the rescue from the high camp at 26,000 feet, and Kipa Sherpa was the liaison to Lincoln Hall's team at advance base camp at 21,000 feet.

Extended stays at extreme altitude are risky even when planned in advance and when climbers have all the supplies they need. By using their own survival supplies to sustain Hall, going to the summit after so many hours spent helping Hall was out of the question. Staying there to care for Hall, they took a risk the weather would turn for the worse and they might even not have sufficient oxygen and food to support themselves on the way down. In abandoning their own attempt on the summit in order to save Hall's life, epitomized the noblest traditions of mountaineering. Mazur said of his team abandoning their summit attempt, "The summit is still there and we can go back. Lincoln only has one life."

Several print  as well as television documentaries  tell the story in detail. Their actions were underscored by the death of British climber David Sharp a few days earlier, a solo climber who had been terribly sick and other mountaineers who passed by him on their way to the summit.

Rick Allen rescue 
During the 2018 Broad Peak Expedition, Mazur and his team rescued Rick Allen, a British climber who disappeared at night near the summit and whose team mates reported him dead and descended with Rick's satellite phone. Mazur and team found Rick Allen alive and brought him down to base camp 3 days later.

Community and environmental engagement 
Each year Mazur leads and organizes groups of volunteers to visit, bring supplies, medicines, health care and education to the Himalayas.

Climbing record

See also
List of Mount Everest guides
List of Mount Everest summiters by number of times to the summit

References

Sources 
 Olympia news article re 2006 rescue
 Summit Climb Biop

External links
 NBC Dateline: Left for Dead on Mt. Everest
 Mount Everest Foundation
 EverestNews.com
 Mount Everest Foundation

Living people
American mountain climbers
Fellows of the Explorers Club
American summiters of Mount Everest
Heller School for Social Policy and Management alumni
University of Montana alumni
Year of birth missing (living people)